Rodrigo Borja Cevallos (born 19 June 1935) is an Ecuadorian politician who was President of Ecuador from 10 August 1988 to 10 August 1992. He is also a descendant of the House of Borgia.

Life
Borja was born in Quito, the capital of Ecuador. He helped to found the Party of the Democratic Left, a socialist political party which quickly gained strength. He served several terms in Congress, leaving it in 1982. Borja first ran for President of Ecuador in 1978, coming in fourth place. He again ran for president in 1984, receiving the most votes in the first round, 36%, but he was defeated in the runoff. He succeeded in winning the 1988 presidential election.

He focused on Ecuador's economic problems during his presidency, and he increased collaboration with other countries in the Americas. He spent time with U.S. President George H. W. Bush on 22 and 23 July 1990, even playing tennis with him. The two met again on 26 February 1992, at a drug policy conference.

Like all Ecuadorian presidents, he was not allowed to seek a second term. After his presidency, he remained the leader of the Party of the Democratic Left. Reelection was allowed after a 1994 referendum and he ran for President in 1998, receiving 12% of the vote and coming in third place, and again ran for president in 2002, receiving 14% of the vote and fourth place.

It is claimed that he is a direct descendant of Pope Alexander VI through his son Giovanni Borgia, 2nd Duke of Gandia.

Marriage and children
On 16 December 1966, in the city of Quito, he married Carmen Calisto. They had four children:

Gabriela Borja Calisto
María del Carmen Borja Calisto
Rodrigo Borja Calisto
Verónica Borja Calisto

See also
Party of the Democratic Left
Alfredo Vera Arrata

References

External links
Biography by CIDOB (in Spanish)

1935 births
Living people
People from Quito
Presidents of Ecuador
Democratic Left (Ecuador) politicians
Rodrigo